Gong Byeong-Ho (Hanja: 孔柄淏, born May 10, 1960) is a South Korean conservative scholar, economist, and author. After graduating from Korea University, Gong received his Ph.D in Economics at Rice University in 1987. Amongst the hundreds of books that he has written so far, the most influential include Korea, 10 Years Later, Gong Byeong-Ho's Self-Management, Standing Up as a One-Man Company, Thoughts of a Rich Man and Poor Man, Gong Byeong-Ho's Greek Classics. In the year 2013, Gong wrote Gong Byeong-Ho’s Life Philosophy, To My Son in the Military, Korea, 5 Years Later through the Lens of Developmental Psychology. In 2014, Gong wrote Gong Byeong-Ho’s Bible Study, God that Gong Byeong-Ho Met, Jesus that Gong Byeong-Ho Met. Gong is the president of the Gong Institute.

Life overview

Early life
Gong was born on May 10, 1960 in Gyeongnam Tongyeong province in the southern region of South Korea as the youngest son in the family of three sons and four daughters. Gong describes the place he grew up in his autobiography Obsessed with Excellence: "Even though the house that my family lived is now a part of a city, back then, located near the sea and called Hannam-dong (south of the port), it was where the fishermen gathered and an important area for the fishing industry. Like its name, the neighborhood which was located south of the seaport had many abandoned materials from the time of Japanese occupation of Korea. In his autobiography, Gong describes his father Gong Tae-Jong (born in 1924) and mother Lee Jeong-Soon (born in 1925) as follows: "It wouldn’t be an exaggeration to describe my parents as people who worked their hardest to their utmost capacities. My mother’s hands, from all the work at home and at the fishery, were as rugged as those of manual workers, and it is those hands that first come to my mind when I reminisce about my mother. When I think about my father, diligence, sincerity, and adventurism are the words that first come to my mind while diligence, sacrifice, and devotion are the words that I think of when reminiscing about my mother. I have always aspired to live a moral and honest life because I remember the sacrifice and dedication that my parents have shown in their lives."

Having first left home in 8th grade to attend a high school in Busan (second largest city in South Korea), Gong eventually studied economics at Korea University and completed a PhD in Economics at Rice University.

Gong devoted the earlier parts of his career for the economic advancement and liberalization of South Korea. He founded the Center for Free Enterprise and it was during this time that Gong came to solidify his economic and political views as a libertarian.

A period of personal crisis as Gong begins his brief but compact experience as a CEO. Later, Gong would recall his experience during this time as a period of turmoil where he realized his true professional calling.

A period of personal and professional growth where, through the creation and running of the Gong Research Institute, Gong pursues his true calling as a writer, lecturer, biographer, and professional mentor. In his dissertation. Suh Dong-Jin, a professor, describes Gong as one of the foremost important self-management guru who has successfully incorporated himself into a one-man company, paving his own future with his own philosophy and techniques."

In the later stages of his career, Gong comes to take an interest in Ancient Greek Philosophy, publishing several books in which he interprets and analyzes famous Greek philosophers such as Socrates and Aristotle. He also converts to Christianity.

Timeline
1983. 2 Graduated from Korea University majoring in Economics
1987. 5 Received Ph.D in Economics from Rice University
1988. 4 ~ 1990. 5 Primary National Development Research Institute
1992. 10 ~ 1993. 3 Economic Researcher at Japan's Nagoya University
1990. 6 ~ 1997. 3 Department Head at Korea Economic Research Institute
1997. 4 ~ 1999. 12 Chief of Center for Free Enterprise 
2000. 1 ~ 2000. 2 Director of Center for Free Enterprise
2000. 3 ~ 2001. 2 Chief Executive Officer of Intizen
2001. 3 ~ 2001. 7 Board Member of Core info Corporation
2002. 4 ~ 2012. 6 Board Member of Kyobo Life Insurance Corporation
2008. 2 ~ 2010. 2 Board Member of S&TC 
2010.12 ~ 2011.12 Adviser to the Prosecutor Policy Evaluation Committee 
2015. 1 ~ Member of the Prosecutor Office Development Committee 
1998. 8 ~ Member of the Mont Pelerin Society 
2012. 5 ~ Board Member of Pony Chung Organization 
2001. 10 ~ Present President of Gong Institute

Publication

2019

 January: Stand Up! Study Standing Up, Work Standing Up

2018

October: Without Name, Without Light: the Legacy of American Pastors on the Korean Peninsula 
July: Reading as a Weapon
May: A Christian's Self-Management
February: The Unstable Peace - The Partnership that will Decide the Faith of South Korea
2017
April: The Party is Over, A Report on the Current State of Korea
February: Biography of Lee Yong Man - Rising from the Ashes of Tragedy
January: Gong Byeong-Ho, Corporate Man's Role Model
January: Biography of Kim Jae Chul, his Life and Management Philosophy and The Story of Dongwon Group
2016
April: Gong Byeong Ho, Encountering Life in Talmud: Finding Strength through Jewish Wisdom
February: Kim Jae Chul: Story of Life and Business on the Sea - Founder of Dongwon Group
January: In Three Years, Korea will not Exist
2015
July: A Leader's Compass is in People
2014
July: Gong Byeong Ho's Encounter with Jesus Christ 
April: Gong Byeong Ho's Encounter with God

January: Gong Byeong Ho's Bible Study
2013
November: Gong Byeong Ho's Dictionary on Life
June: In Sending my Son to the Military
January: Future of Korea through the Lens of Evolutionary Psychology
2012
November: Gong Byeong Ho's Classics: Aristotle on Hopeful Politics
August: Gong Byeong Ho's Classics 3: Aristotle on True Happiness
June: Gong Byeong Ho's Destiny Changing Study Guide
March: Gong Byeong Ho's Classics 2: Socrates and Plato on Justice
March: Gong Byeong Ho's Classics 1: Socrates and Plato on Excellent Life.
2011
October: Habits Do Not Betray
July: "일취월장" – On Growth
March: Obsessed with Excellence
January: Story of the Growth and Decline of Korean Corporations
2010
October: "우문현답" – Wise Answers on Life
August: Mobile Revolution 
May: Life Coach
March: Korea's Growth Spurt
2009
December: Intuition 
August: Mr. Taebong, Thirty-three, Sprint Towards Success
June: On How to Overcome Obstacles 
March: Soulmate
February: The Art of Leading
2008
November: The World and Korea in Three Years 
September: Life Skills
August: 10 Year Project for Our Children
May: Future Elite's Necessary Qualifications
March: Diamond
January: Oasis
2007
October: Korea, its 10 year Decision
July: Gong Byeong Ho's Adaptive Management
July: Gong Byeong Ho's Creative Management
April: Espresso, The Little Delight in Life
April: Thought Planning for Kids
2006
December: Life is Economics
December: English as Inheritance
October: Hope Leadership
July: Gong Byeong Ho's Chocolate
February: The Ten Year Rule
December: Knowledge Plus Money Economics 
October: 12 Year Old's First Encounter with an Economic Textbook 
2005
December: The Thoughts of a Rich Man vs. Poor Man
June: Korea’ Path to Prosperity
January: The World in Ten Years 
December: Gong Byeong Ho's Self-Management Planning for Teens
July: How to Raise a Child that Succeeds in 10 Years
2004
December: Leader who Records
November: Meditation
June: Korea, 10 Years Later
May: 13 Golden Rules for Self-transformation 
May: Leaders like These Should Quit
May: Tips on Practical Reading
March: Rules of Negotiation for Kids
February: Increase Your Weekend Competitive Edge
2003
December: 3040, Bet on Hope
November: Increase Your Brain Efficiency
October: Gong Byeong Ho's Reading Notes: Future Edition
August: Gong Byeong Ho's Reading Notes: Entrepreneur Edition 
June: Gong Byeong Ho's Reading Notes: Management Edition
April: Gong Byeong Ho's Reading Notes: US Edition
March: Gong Byeong Ho's Reading Notes: Creative Edition
July: Child who Achieves Dreams vs. Child who Chases Someone's Dreams 
June: Kira's Adventure: Ancient Edition 1,2,3,
May: Child Who Communicates Well vs. Child Who Cannot Communicate Well. 
February: Child Whose Friends Follow vs. Child Who Follows Friends
2002
August: Gong Byeong Ho's Practical Self-Management Program
June: Sow the Seeds of Gold
January: To Stand as a One Man Company
2001
December: Gong Byeong Ho's Self-Management Notebook 
1993~1999
1999: February: Market Economy and Democracy
1998: March: Corporate Man
1997: January: Market Economy and Its Enemies
1997: May: What is Market Economy
1996: December: Conflicted Instinct
1995: July: Transfer of Power in the Korean Economy
1994: June: Restructuring for Korean Corporations 
1993: November: The Growth and Decline of Korean Companies
1992: September: Chaebols, Do They Need to be Hated?

Awards and recognitions
1995: Awarded the 7th Free Economy Publication Award for the book Transfer of Power in the Korean Economy
1996: Awarded the 8th Free Economy Publication Award for the book What is Market Economy
1997: Awarded the 9th Free Economy Publication Award for the book Market Economy and Its Enemies
2014: Gong Byeong Ho’s Life Dictionary recommended by the Ministry of Culture
2011: The Growth and Decline of Korean Companies recommended by the Ministry of Culture
2010: Korea’s Growth Spurt recommended by the Ministry of Culture
2009: The Art of Leading recommended by the Ministry of Culture
July 8, 2009: Selected by Maekyoung Economist Magazine's 30th Anniversary Publication as the 4th Most Influential "Management Guru" who represents South Korea 
"Only Management Guru who is not affiliated with a particular corporation"
February 19, 2009: Awarded the Famous Lecturer Award by Korea's HRD Association
July 2, 2008: Selected by Maekyoung Economist Magazine's 29th Anniversary Publication as the 8th Most Influential "Management Guru" who represents South Korea
November 1, 2006: Designated as the Most Sought After Expert by Total Branding Korea and Gallup Polling

Activities and purpose
Gong founded the Center for Free Enterprise in order to advocate for ideals of freedom, individualism, and market enterprise.

He sought to provide a platform through which intellectuals could voice their opinions and exchange their beliefs and ideas on liberalism. The Center for Free Enterprise was established with the hopes of affecting change with a limited number of manpower and grants (p. 269)
A former President of Center for Free Enterprise, Dr. Kim Jeong Ho (current President of Freedom Factory) said in the 10th Anniversary of Center for Free Enterprise that "Dr. Gong was a brilliant entrepreneur. From the very moment he created the [CFE], new products started pouring out of the institution. His very first and most expensive project was introducing to Korea important liberal publications by the likes of Hayek, Mises, Ayn Rand, Buchanon, Kirzner, and North under the series named the ‘Liberal Series.’ Gong's work was not an extension of the works of Director Kim Jin Hyun, but similar. However, his work found no match in the size and the speed at which the institution grew.

As of now there are more than 50 books in the ongoing Liberal Series and many of the books on liberalism have been translated into Korean.

Writer

Philosophy on writing
Everyone learns in different ways and according to Gong, he learns best by writing books. Gong does not write because he is knowledgeable about the field, but he writes to become knowledgeable about the field. Gong has written over a hundred books. "I write not because I know, but because I want to know. The reason why I have written about such diverse topics as economics, management, leadership, ancient Greek philosophy, and the bible is because of my thirst for knowledge. I am the type that loses interest easily, so I am used to focusing on certain topics for a certain period of time to write a book. Honestly, at the end of the day, the reason why I write about such diverse number of topics is to live an interesting and fun life (Gong Byeong-Ho’s Study Guide, 175).

Areas of concentration
Because Gong is not bounded to a certain corporation as a researcher or a professor, he writes freely about whatever topics interest him. He is known to not have structural framework when writing a book because his understanding and depth of knowledge on a topic changes and evolves as he learns more about it. He usually gives himself about a year but prefers not to plan further than that because, as his understanding of the topic changes, the topic of the book itself changes. In his 30s, Gong focused on the market economy, growth and decline of corporations, liberalism, chaebols, and entrepreneurship. In his 40s, Gong focused on the economic growth of Korea, self-management, leadership, and parenting. In his 50s, Gong has focused on ancient philosophy, self-development, critiques of social issues, and the bible.

Short pieces
Gong often writes short pieces on things he's observed, day-to-day interactions that he finds interesting, and reflections on a movie or a piece of news that he's read. Wherever he encounters materials that he can write about, he posts them on his blog. He likes to call the Gong Institute's website his own public study platform. Writing about whatever passes through his thoughts is a hobby for him that he enjoys. "Write about the new person, information, knowledge, and experience that you may have met through your eyes, ears, lips, and nose; whatever it is that you may have encountered, write down your own thoughts that was formed through your encounter with it. Do not consider this to be writing of the formal kind. It is different from writing with a certain goal in mind. Writing light pieces is all about writing whatever slips through your thoughts without the pressure of having to write well. (Gong Byeong Ho’s Study Guide, 98).

Lecturer

Lecturer

Gong is one of the most influential lecturer in Korea. He has averaged around 300 lectures per year. He built up his credentials as lecturer during his time as student and assistant professor in both Korea and United States and further enhanced his understanding of economics and management through leading the creation and the development of the Center for Free Enterprise. An article on the industry for lectures and professional mentorship stated the following: "Guest lecturers prefer corporations that hold various events for their employees. That’s because the pay and the prestige that comes along with being a lecturer at corporate events are huge. The most prominent among the lecturers is the Gong and Goo combo. Both have put forth their names as their main brands. They both focus on similar fields such as predicting economic prospects, self-management, change-management, leadership, etc. They are not only knowledgeable in the fields aforementioned, but they have continued to lead their own research institutes and stay active in other fields such as writing, publishing, and teaching.

Lecture topics and audience
Gong is one of the few in Korea who is knowledgeable enough to give talks and lectures on a variety of different topics. Over the last decade, Gong has provided various workshops and talk series on economics, management, self-management, humanities, corporate management, leadership, and more. He’s audience vary from corporate employees and CEOs to religious and educational institutions. 또한 그는 기업, 기관, 학교, 단체 등 다양한 고객군을 갖고 있다.

Self-management academy
"Self-Management Academy" is a phrase that Gong popularized in the recent years. After publishing the famed Gong Byeong Ho’s Self-Management Notebook and Gong Byeong Ho’s Practical Guide to Self-Management in 2003, Gong created and ran a 6-8 hour weekend workshop on self-management. Many young students starting from middle school up until college, and even those beyond college-level education have benefited from these programs. According to a former student said "I realized how planning and having goals in life is really important. The program taught me how much I lacked in self-management planning. It also helped me realize what I wanted to achieve in life and helped me gain confidence in myself to achieve the goals that I set out for myself. Another said “I used to find myself unable to concentrate, but now every second of the day is precious.” Until now Gong has completed 137, 116, 101, and 51 sessions for middle school students, high school students, post-college adults, and elementary school students, respectively.

Economist

Economist
Gong's bases his theories and principles of economics on the liberal assumption that we need to minimize government interventions in the social realm of the society and maximize the options available to the people. He developed his ideas and hones his understanding of these theories in his 30s as he aimed to develop the Center for Free Enterprise and published numerous books on economic theory such as What is Market Economy and Corporate Man. These theories were further clarified in his 40s through his books such as Korea in Ten Years and Korea’s Road to Prosperity. In his book, The Market Economy and its Enemies, Gong writes "we must continue to accumulate mental assets so that our society can prosper. We must continue to strive to understand the concept of individual liberty and freedom to choose, the existence of competing and often conflicting ideas, the process of creating and accumulating wealth, corporation’s relationship with the public, bureaucrats and politicians, necessary principles for a free tolerant society, charitable acts by the public to the less well-off, separation of power, and the tyranny of the majority." (The Market Economy and its Enemies, 351).

Conservative or right-wing critique
In the book, The Conservatives, in which 10 journalists discuss what it means to be a conservative in Korea, it mentions Gong as one of the top 10 conservative critique in Korea that has influenced the conservative movement in Korea. It names Gong as one of the top 3 conservative trio and one of the most "radical" conservatives in Korea.

One-Man Company

The Original One-Man Company
Gong is known to in Koreas as a "One-Man Company." According to the book, Korea’s One-Man Stock Company, Gong is unmatched by anyone else in the field of self-management. He has positioned himself to become a model of a one-man company business model." Another said the following: "Recently there has been a trend to accumulate knowledge, one of the byproduct of this movement is an increase in "single intellectual individuals" and...Gong Byeong-Ho is a good example of that."

Innovator

Innovation
Unlike those who create services and products, it is often difficult for an intellectual entrepreneur to succeed through simple distribution and selling of knowledge, concepts, ideas, and principles. However, for Gong, as he mentioned in one of his interviews, "it is only when every citizen becomes an intellectual entrepreneur themselves that Korea will prosper."

Innovation in life
When asked what the word innovation means to Gong, he says, "come to think about it, I have always strived towards for a ‘better life.’ I’ve achieved that through change and innovation. For me that has always meant breaking old boundaries and customs, never listening to others when they say that something should be done a certain way. I’ve always torn those boundaries down and moved forward. I’ve always been cognizant of other people's opinion, but never bothered too much about it. Life is a work of art and I found it a necessity, not a choice, to strive towards a better life."

Examples of continued innovation for a better life
10s: In middle school, Gong begged his father to let him move to a city to continue his studies. He mentions that he has always been ambitious. Although from an ordinary family, he has worked his way up to attend one of the top three universities in Korea (Korea University).
20s: Gong continued his journey towards an excellent life. During college when his family found itself in financial difficulties, Gong decided that it would be best for him and his family’s future to pursue his studies in the United States. Understanding that his parents would not be able to provide for him, he found the means (scholarships) to fund himself through his graduate studies. Moreover, having met his wife before moving to the US to continue his studies in economics at Rice University, Gong worked diligently to finish his studies as soon as possible and return to Korea to start a family.
30s: Recognizing his knack for writing, Gong pursued a career in academia and journalism to meet people from various walks of life and pursue a career that will allow him to cultivate his interest in expanding his own knowledge base. During his time as a researcher, Gong pursued what was at the time a revolutionary concept in Korea: creating publications aimed directly at the public (Gong was almost fired for this stunt). Gong further pursued a researcher position in Japan. It was also in his thirties that Gong found his purpose and passion in liberalism. Through dedication and a lot of persuasion, Gong also succeeded in creating the Center for Free Enterprise where during his first three years he created and disseminated liberal ideas through the "Liberal Series." He further focused on creating a platform where academics and intellectuals alike could come together to share their ideas. Gong devoted his 30s to raise funds for the newly created CFE, through which he aimed to influence and affect positive policy changes in Korea, culminating in various publications, debate shows, and lectures through which Gong was able to accrue his status as the "guru." Gong ended his career in public services when he decided to pursue a different career path in the private sector.
40s: Having left his comfortable position in the public sector, Gong succeeded in creating his very own research institute under the name of Gong Institute. He established himself as a one-man company and spent most of his time churning out various books on diverse number of topics, and writing profusely on the Korean economy, management, etc. Gong recognized that his career laid in affecting change through conversations and writings and pursued that road fervently. One of the products of his work was a well-renowned book Korea in Ten Years which accurately predicted the economic demise of South Korea. Whilst pursuing his career, Gong also strove to provide his children with the best kind of education, sending both of his sons to study in US in the early 2000s. Gong also created Self-Management Academy, one of his most innovative program which became one of the pillars of his business model. Throughout his 40s, Gong focused on producing countless number of writings through his blogs, newsletters, and website.
50s: Having started them in his 40s, Gong continued to give lectures and talks series to various corporations and public institutions. However, he's preference changed in his 50s as he came to realize that spiritual knowledge is just as important as practical knowledge on which he spent most of his career writing about. He turned his focus onto philosophy, especially western and ancient philosophy, and Christianity. In Korea, the industry for biographies have not been as well established compared to other countries around the world. By publishing Kim Jae Chul's official biography, Gong created a new biography market in Korea. Most recently, Gong has also pursued writing poetry.

References

20th-century South Korean economists
South Korean libertarians
Korea University alumni
Rice University alumni
Living people
1960 births
People from Tongyeong
21st-century South Korean economists